Milde may refer to:

Places
Milde, Bergen, a neighborhood and peninsula in the city of Bergen, Norway
Milde (river), a river of Saxony-Anhalt, Germany

People
 Carl August Julius Milde, a German bryologist and pteridologist born in Breslau
 Carl Julius Milde, a German painter, curator and art restorer
 Eirik Milde, a Norwegian politician for the Conservative Party
 Franz von Milde, a German tenor, son of Hans and Rosa
 Hans von Milde, an Austrian operatic baritone, husband of Rosa, father of Franz
 Lothar Milde, an East German athlete who competed mainly in the discus throw
 Ludwig Milde, a composer of music for the bassoon
 Paul Milde, a German footballer who plays as a forward for Dynamo Dresden
 Rosa von Milde née Rosa Agthe (1827–1906), a German operatic soprano and voice teacher, wife of Hans, mother of Franz
 Rocco Milde, a German former footballer who played as a striker
 Tor Milde, a Norwegian music journalist and writer
 Vinzenz Eduard Milde, Prince-Archbishop of Vienna